The Anaconda Serpents were a minor league baseball team based in Anaconda, Montana. In 1900, the Anaconda Serpents played the season as members of the Independent level Montana State League. The Anaconda Serpents were the only minor league team hosted in Anaconda and played minor league home games at Mountain View Park.

History
Minor league baseball began in Anaconda, Montana when Anaconda Serpents became members of the Independent level Montana State League in 1900. Other members of the four–team league were the 
Butte Smoke Eaters, Great Falls Indians and Helena Senators.

The 1900 Anaconda Serpents had an overall record of 34–37 and placed 3rd in the four–team Montana State League standings. Anaconda finished behind the 1st place Great Falls Indians (39–32) and Helena Senators (39–33) and ahead of the 4th place Butte Smoke Eaters (30–40) in the final standings. The 1900 Anaconda Serpents were first managed by player/manager John "Jack" Grim, who resigned to become an umpire in the league, being replaced as Anaconda manager by Dad Clarkson.

Jack Grim's resignation letter as manager of the Anaconda Serpents was reported to have said, "I cannot do myself justice while laboring under these conditions." Grim later went on to manage other minor league teams.

The Montana State League folded after the 1900 season. 1900 was the only season of play for the Anaconda Serpents and Anaconda, Montana has not hosted another minor league team.

The ballpark
The Anaconda Serpents played home minor league games at Mountain View Park. Cricket games were later played at Mountain View Park. Today, the park is still in use as a public park. Mountain View Park is located on South Alice Street, Anaconda, Montana.

Year–by–year record

Notable alumni
Kid Carsey (1900)
Dad Clarkson (1900, MGR)
Walter Coleman (1900)
Mike Lynch (1900)
Jim McHale (1900)
Charlie Swindells (1900)

See also
Anaconda Serpents players

References

External link
Baseball Reference

Defunct minor league baseball teams
Defunct baseball teams in Montana
Baseball teams established in 1900
Baseball teams disestablished in 1900
Deer Lodge County, Montana
Montana State League teams